The Warriors EP, Volume 2 is the name of P.O.D.'s third EP, second in their "Warriors EP" series, which contains demos from the Testify recording sessions, a cover of the Payola$ song, "Eyes Of A Stranger," and live versions of "Wildfire" and "Boom" recorded at Cornerstone Festival 2004. The inside of the cover contains a message from lead singer Sonny Sandoval to the 'Warriors', P.O.D.'s worldwide following of fans. The EP was released on November 15, 2005 and was limited to 40,000 copies.

Track listing

Personnel
P.O.D.
 Sonny Sandoval – lead vocals
 Jason Truby – guitars, backing vocals
 Traa Daniels – bass, backing vocals
 Wuv Bernardo – drums, backing vocals

References

P.O.D. albums
2005 EPs
Atlantic Records EPs